Muriel Frances Dana (1916 – 1997) was a child actress in thirteen silent films from 1921 to 1926, appearing in two of them as a boy, Hail the Woman and Can a Woman Love Twice?. She was born in Clinton, Iowa and died in Thousand Oaks, California.

Filmography
Hail the Woman (1921)
White Hands (1922)
A Fool There Was (1922)
Skin Deep (1922)
The Forgotten Law (1922)
 Can a Woman Love Twice? (1923)
The Sunshine Trail (1923)
Daddies (1924)
Wandering Husbands (1924)
The Fast Worker (1924)
The Sign of the Cactus (1925)
Compromise (1925)
Mike (1926)

External links

American film actresses
American silent film actresses
American child actresses
Actresses from Iowa
People from Clinton, Iowa
1916 births
1997 deaths
20th-century American actresses